Edward Earl Fitzgerald (September 10, 1919 – February 11, 2001) was a sports journalist, editor of Sport magazine, executive in chief of the Book of the Month Club, founder of the Quality Paperback Book Club,  president of the books division at Doubleday Publishing, and president of McCall's Magazine Group. He was also an author of sports biographies. His own memoirs include A Nickel an Inch: An Autobiography, and That Place in Minnesota.

Fitzgerald built himself a good reputation during his time as editor of Sport magazine during the 1950s. After he moved on to become president of Doubleday books, he continued to work editing and writing. He helped Yogi Berra write Berra's autobiography which Doubleday published. He also co-wrote with tennis player Althea Gibson, sportscaster Mel Allen, and football player Johnny Unitas on their autobiographies.

Books
 Tales for males, New York : Cadillac Pub. Co., 1945
 Kick-off!, New York : Bantam Books, 1948
 The turning point, New York : A.S. Barnes, 1948
 College slugger, New York : A.S. Barnes, 1950
 Yankee rookie, New York : Barnes, 1952
 The book of major league baseball clubs, New York, A.S. Barnes, 1952
 The book of major league baseball clubs: The American league, New York, A.S. Barnes & Co., 1952
 The book of major league baseball clubs: The National league, New York, A.S. Barnes and Co., 1952
 A treasury of sport stories; the best articles, New York, Bartholomew House, 1955
 Champions in sports and spirit, New York, Farrar, Straus & Cudahy, 1956
 The ballplayer, : A.S. Barnes and Co., 1957
 I always wanted to be Somebody . . . Edited by Ed. Fitzgerald, by Althea Gibson; Ed Fitzgerald, W.H. Allen: London, 1959
 More champions in sports and spirit, New York, Vision Books, 1959
 Heroes of sport, New York : Bartholomew House, 1960
 Johnny Unitas : the amazing success story of Mr. Quarterback, New York : Nelson, 1961
 Yogi: The Autobiography of a Baseball Player, by Yogi Berra and Ed Fitzgerald, Garden City, N.Y., Doubleday, 1961
 You can't beat the hours; a long, loving look at big-league baseball, including some Yankees I have known, New York, Harper & Row, 1964
 Pro quarterback, my own story,  by Johnny Unitas; Ed Fitzgerald, New York, Simon and Schuster, 1965
 A nickel an inch : a memoir, New York : Atheneum, 1985
 That place in Minnesota : changing lives, saving lives, New York, N.Y. : Viking, 1990
 One Giant leap, New York : Putnam's, 1991

References

1919 births
2001 deaths
American male journalists
20th-century American journalists
American sportswriters
20th-century American non-fiction writers
American sports journalists
20th-century American male writers